Acacia oligoneura is a shrub belonging to the genus Acacia and the subgenus Juliflorae that is endemic to a small area of north western Australia.

Description
It flowers from October to May producing yellow flowers. It has many resinous stems and angular, flattened and glabrous branchlets that are greenish yellow to pale brown colour and usually scurfy. Like most species of Acacia it has phyllodes rather than true leaves. The chartaceous to thinly coriaceous, light olive-green and glabrous phyllodes have a very narrowly oblanceolate or elliptic shape and are straight or slightly curved.

Distribution
It is native to Kimberley region of Western Australia where it is found in clay or lateritic soils over laterite or basalt. The range extends to the east as far as Noonamah, found to the south of Darwin with populations found in the Litchfield and Daly River catchments as well as around the Victoria River where it is found on rocky slopes and plateaux as a part of woodland communities.

See also
List of Acacia species

References

oligoneura
Acacias of Western Australia
Plants described in 1859
Taxa named by Ferdinand von Mueller
Flora of the Northern Territory